is a Japanese snowboarder. She represented Japan at the 2022 Winter Olympics.

Career
Miki is a four-time silver medalist at the FIS Snowboarding Junior World Championships, winning two in parallel slalom in 2019 and 2020 and two in parallel giant slalom 2020 and 2021. She made her senior debut at the 2021 FIS Snowboarding Championships, where she finished in 11th in the parallel slalom, and 20th in the parallel giant slalom.

References

External links

Tsubaki Miki Official Website
Yamaha Motor (Tsubaki Miki Support Site)
Tsubaki Miki Supporters' Assosiation
Tsubaki Supporters

2003 births
Living people
Japanese female snowboarders
Olympic snowboarders of Japan
Snowboarders at the 2022 Winter Olympics
21st-century Japanese women